Cassiopeia is a 1996 Brazilian CGI animated feature film, produced and released by NDR Filmes in Brazil on April 1, 1996.

The film is an adventure about the invasion of planet Ateneia by intruders trying to steal their energy. This film claims to be the first entirely computer-generated feature film. The earlier Toy Story has been criticized for employing clay models that were later scanned and digitized, while Cassiopeia used only software to create its visuals. The film was released soon after Toy Story.

Plot
The planet Ateneia, located in the constellation of Cassiopeia, is attacked by space invaders who begin to drain its vital energy. A distress signal is sent into outer space by the local astronomer, Liza, and received by four heroes – Chip, Chop, Feel and Thot – who travel across the galaxy to the rescue. The heroes venture through the galaxy facing many dangers as they try to rescue Ateneia. Each has a specific function in their spaceship: Chop is the captain and pilot, Feel and Thot monitor space, and Chip is the gunman, working also as comic relief throughout. Liza is an astronomer in Ateneia’s main laboratory, working on all of the scientific details of the planet’s life. On the way to defeat the evil forces of Shadowseat, the foursome meet Leonardo, a scientist from an undeveloped planet who creates crazy gadgets.

Development
Production began in 1992 with environment and character modelling and the creation of the script. Animation began in 1993, and the image-generation work was completed in 1995. The soundtrack was finished later that year, and the first copy was printed in early 1996. 

The film was animated using Crystal Graphics’ Topas Animator, running on seventeen 486 DX2–66 computers. The first character model was made on a 20 MHz 386 SX. Cassiopeia's animation team was composed of seven computer animators, three traditional animators (who served as consultants and directors of animation), and some freelancers. Mid-way through production some of the computers were stolen, requiring some scenes to be re-animated.

Voice cast

See also
 Toy Story
 List of animated feature-length films
 List of computer-animated films

References

External links
 
 MCI - Museu da Computação e Informática 

1996 computer-animated films
1996 films
Brazilian animated science fiction films
Brazilian children's films
1990s Portuguese-language films
Animated feature films
Films set on fictional planets